"Tell Me" is a song by American R&B duo Groove Theory from their debut album, Groove Theory (1995). The single peaked at number five on the US Billboard Hot 100 and also reached the top 10 in Australia, peaking at number six on the ARIA Singles Chart for three weeks in February 1996. The single also reached number 14 in New Zealand and number 31 in both Iceland and the United Kingdom. "Tell Me" is certified gold in Australia and the United States.

The track is a cover of Rhythm-N-Bass' 1993 song "Tell Me (If You Want Me Too)", which was also produced by Wilson. It also contains an interpolation of Mary Jane Girls' "All Night Long" which itself interpolates Keni Burke's "Risin' to the Top".

Music video
The music video, directed by Daniela Federeci, begins with Amel Larrieux and Bryce Wilson in a recording studio. Amel sings into the microphone, whilst Bryce produces behind the studio panel. Amel bops in front a city skyline in other scenes. In between scenes are transitional shots, which feature either Amel singing or Bryce nodding.

Legacy
In 2003, Raymond & Co wrote "Playing Games", which was melodically inspired by "Tell Me". In 2017, Australian singer Starley wrote "Touch Me", which was also heavily inspired by "Tell Me".

Charts

Weekly charts

Year-end charts

Certifications

Release history

AXSHN version
On June 9, 2017, production group AXSHN released a version of the song featuring Mexican singer Sofia Reyes. Erica Russell from PopCrush described it as a "throbbing tropical dance banger". The reviewer also highlighted Reyes' voice, writing "Sofia's smooth, sultry vocals beckon to the dance floor like the reflection of the moon sparkling against the Caribbean Sea".

References

1995 debut singles
1995 songs
Epic Records singles
Groove Theory songs
Songs written by Bryce Wilson
Songs written by Rick James